Events of 2019 in Serbia.

Incumbents 
 President: Aleksandar Vučić
 Prime Minister: Ana Brnabić

Events 

 January 17 – State Visit of Russian President Vladimir Putin to Belgrade.
 August 18 – "Miloš the Great" Highway, a section of Corridor XI (or A2 motorway; part of the E761 and E763 European routes) from Obrenovac to Preljina, is opened.

Births

Deaths 

 January 5 – Dragoslav Šekularac, footballer and manager (b. 1937)
 January 24 – Dušan Makavejev, film director (b. 1932)
 February 17 – Šaban Šaulić, singer (b. 1951)

See also 

 2019 European Parliament election

References 

 
Serbia
Serbia
2010s in Serbia
Years of the 21st century in Serbia